The English cricket team in North America in 1859 was the first ever overseas cricket tour by an English team. The touring team is sometimes referred to as George Parr's XI.

Organisation
The idea for the tour came from William Pickering, a former player who had emigrated to Canada in 1852 and first captained Canada against the United States the following year. Together with Robert Waller from St George's Cricket Club, Pickering opened discussions for a possible tour in 1856 but financial problems meant that it was three years before the money could be raised. The English team required a guarantee of £600, which Pickering obtained through the Montreal Cricket Club, Hamilton Cricket Club and St George's Cricket Club.

Team
The English team comprised six members of the All-England Eleven and six of the United All-England Eleven. With George Parr as captain, the twelve players were effectively the cream of professional talent in the 1859 English cricket season that had just ended:

Matches

Five matches were played, all against XXIIs, so none had first-class status.  Three exhibition games were also played in which the 12 England players divided and added five North Americans to each team to make up eleven-a-side matches. Including travelling time, the trip lasted two months and each English player (all professionals) earned about £90, a sizeable sum at the time.

The team's opponents were:

 22 of Lower Canada by 8 wickets at Montreal, Quebec on 26–27 September
 22 of the United States by an innings and 64 runs at Elysian Fields, Hoboken, New Jersey on 3–5 October
 22 of the United States by 7 wickets at Camac Woods, Philadelphia, Pennsylvania on 10–12 October
 22 of Upper Canada by 10 wickets at Hamilton, Ontario on 17–19 October
 22 of the United States and Canada by an innings and 68 runs at Rochester, New York on 21–25 October.

One of the exhibition matches was played 14 October at Camac Woods.

Among their opponents were Harry Wright, a future pioneer of professional baseball, and Charles H. T. Collis, future Medal of Honor winner in the American Civil War.

In addition to the exhibition matches they also had two excursions to view the Niagara Falls.

The English side was exceedingly strong and would probably have beaten any twenty-two in England. There were excellent crowds for the first three matches but the weather in mid-October turned very cold and reduced the attendances at the last two. It was reported that the fielders wore gloves and overcoats in the last match.

Aftermath

A product of the tour was a book by Fred Lillywhite, who travelled as scorer, entitled The English Cricketers' Trip to Canada and the United States and published in 1860. A reprint of the book was published in 1980 with an introduction by Robin Marlar, including biographies of all of the players.

For the general growth of cricket in the United States, it was most unfortunate that this pioneering tour occurred only 18 months before the American Civil War began. If the war had not broken out, it is highly likely that two or three follow-up tours might have been arranged in the early 1860s, thus building on the interest created by the initial trip. As it was, the enthusiasm for cricket faded in the war years and the troops on both sides adopted the embryonic game of baseball. When English teams resumed tours to America in 1868, not only did they have to try to rekindle the enthusiasm, but in baseball they had a serious rival to contend with.

References

Further reading

External links
 G. Parr's XI in North America 1859 at CricketArchive
 The English Cricketers' Trip to Canada and the United States by Fred Lillywhite (digitised version at Internet Archive)

1859 in English cricket
Canadian cricket in the 19th century
1859
International cricket competitions from 1844 to 1888
United States cricket in the 19th century
September 1859 sports events
October 1859 sports events